Mānsān is a settlement in Shan State, Burma.

References

See also
Mansan (disambiguation)
Mān San

Populated places in Shan State